Norbert Mnich (born 1966–2016) was a male Polish international table tennis player.

He won a bronze medal at the 1985 World Table Tennis Championships in the Swaythling Cup (men's team event) with Andrzej Grubba, Andrzej Jakubowicz, Leszek Kucharski and Stefan Dryszel for Poland.

He also won a European Table Tennis Championships medal in 1986.

See also
 List of table tennis players
 List of World Table Tennis Championships medalists

References

Polish male table tennis players
1958 births
2016 deaths
World Table Tennis Championships medalists